The Maula Cathedral or simply Cathedral of Lilongwe, is a religious building belonging to the Catholic Church and is located in the town of Lilongwe the capital and largest city of the African country of Malawi. Administratively it is included in the Central Region, near the M1 highway and the Civo Stadium.

The cathedral follows the Roman or Latin rite and serves as the headquarters of the Metropolitan Archdiocese of Lilongwe (Archidioecesis Lilongvensis) which was created as a diocese by Pope John XXIII in 1959 and got its present status in 2011 under the bula Quotiescumque Evangelii of the Pope Benedict XVI.

It is under the pastoral responsibility of Archbishop Tarcisius Gervazio Ziyaye.

See also
Roman Catholicism in Malawi
Cathedral

References

Roman Catholic cathedrals in Malawi
Buildings and structures in Lilongwe